Kinesiological Instrument for Normal and Altered Reaching Movement (KINARM) is an interactive robotic device designed to assess the sensorimotor and cognitive function of the brain through behavioural tasks using the upper limb. There are two types of KINARMs - the KINARM Exoskeleton and the KINARM End-Point. The technology is used by both basic and clinical researchers in order to develop a greater understanding of the neurological impacts of a variety of injuries and diseases. KINARMs allow researchers to collect more objective and quantitative data for assessing brain function than traditional methods. The devices are created by BKIN Technologies Ltd., doing business as Kinarm, in Kingston, Ontario.

History
The first KINARM robot to be created was the KINARM Exoskeleton. It was developed in 1999 by Stephen Scott, a neuroscientist and researcher at Queen's University. The KINARM Exoskeleton was commercialized in 2004 when BKIN Technologies was founded by Dr. Scott and Dr. Ian Brown with the assistance of PARTEQ Innovations.

Product
KINARM robots assess the user's ability to interact with a two-dimensional virtual reality environment using their upper limbs. The KINARM Exoskeleton uses a motorized exoskeleton to measure and manipulate the function of the upper limbs and is produced in both human and non-human primate (NHP) versions. The KINARM End-Point uses hand-held robotic rods and is used primarily for human use. Both robot labs are available with gaze-tracking technology.

As of 2018, there were roughly 100 KINARM labs distributed in 14 countries worldwide.

KINARM standard tests
The KINARM Standard Tests (KST) form a library of automated behavioural tasks designed for use with KINARMs. The KST database has been extensively used in research publications and has created a universal platform for the  comparison of data on neurological function among normal and impaired human populations.

Applications

There are over 275 published peer-reviewed journal articles that use KINARM Labs.

KINARM Labs are being used for concussion evaluation in high-performance athletes at the Canadian Winter Sport Institute as a part of the Canadian Olympic Committee's national concussion strategy.

See also
 Rehabilitation robotics
 Neuropsychology
 Powered exoskeleton
 Motor control

References

External links
 

Medical robots